Argelos is the name of two communes in France:

 Argelos, Landes, in the Landes department
 Argelos, Pyrénées-Atlantiques, in the Pyrénées-Atlantiques department